The New Democratic Party of Manitoba has held seven leadership conventions to select a party leader since its founding in 1961.  In each instance, the leader was chosen by secret-ballot voting among delegates.  The results of these votes are listed below. The leaders of the party's predecessors, the Co-operative Commonwealth Federation (Manitoba Section) and the Independent Labour Party (Manitoba) had all been elected unopposed.

1961 leadership convention
(Held in Winnipeg, Manitoba on November 4, 1961)

Paulley's victory was reported in the Winnipeg Free Press on November 6, 1961.  The numerical totals were not released, but it is generally accepted that Paulley won by a significant majority.  In 1968, he was challenged for the party leadership by fellow legislator Sidney Green.

1968 leadership challenge
(Held in Winnipeg, Manitoba on November 3, 1968)

(Results taken from The Globe and Mail, 4 November 1968.)

Paulley resigned as party leader in 1969.

1969 leadership convention
(Held in Winnipeg, Manitoba on June 7, 1969)

(Results taken from The Globe and Mail, 9 June 1969.)

Schreyer resigned as party leader in January 1979, after being appointed Governor-General of Canada on the advice of Prime Minister Pierre Trudeau.  In the same month, Howard Pawley was chosen as interim leader of the NDP's legislative caucus, defeating Sidney Green and Saul Cherniack in a closed-session vote.

1979 leadership convention
(Held in Winnipeg, Manitoba on November 4, 1979)

A fourth candidate, Nick Ternette, withdrew from the contest on November 2, 1979, and backed Muriel Smith.

(Results taken from The Globe and Mail, 5 November 1979).

Pawley resigned as leader in 1988, after his government lost a vote of confidence in the legislature.  He continued to serve as premier in a caretaker government, and the NDP held a snap leadership convention in the opening weeks of the 1988 provincial election.

1988 leadership convention
(Held in Winnipeg, Manitoba on March 30, 1988)

First ballot:

Hemphill and Santos both fell below the 15% quota required to stay on the ballot and were eliminated.  Hemphill supported Anstett on the second ballot.

Second ballot:

Anstett was eliminated.  Both Anstett and Hemphill supported Harapiak on the third ballot.

Third ballot:

(Results taken from The Globe and Mail and Winnipeg Free Press, 31 March 1988.)

Gary Doer led the Manitoba NDP until 2009 and served as premier of Manitoba from 1999 until 2009.

2009 leadership convention
(Held in Winnipeg, Manitoba on October 17, 2009)

Greg Selinger became leader and was sworn in as Premier on October 19, 2009.

2015 leadership convention
(Held in Winnipeg, Manitoba on March 8, 2015)

The leadership election was called by Selinger as a test of his leadership following a caucus revolt.
First ballot

Ashton eliminated. Releases his delegates, did not publicly endorse another candidate

Second ballot

2017 leadership convention
(Held in Winnipeg, Manitoba on September 16, 2017)

See also
Progressive Conservative Party of Manitoba leadership elections
Manitoba Liberal Party leadership elections

References

 
New Democratic Party provincial leadership elections